The Ambassador of Australia to Laos is an officer of the Australian Department of Foreign Affairs and Trade and the head of the Embassy of the Commonwealth of Australia to the Lao People's Democratic Republic. The Ambassador resides in Vientiane. The Australian Government first announced it would open an embassy in Vientiane in 1962. The current ambassador, since February 2021, is Paul Kelly.

List of heads of mission

References

 
Laos
Australia